Police United FC is a Belizean football team which currently competes in the Premier League of Belize.

The team is based in Belmopan.  Their home stadium is Isidoro Beaton Stadium. Part of the team are made up of police officers from Belize.

From the 2022–23 Premier League of Belize, Benque Viejo United have played under the license of Police United.

Current squad

Performance in international competitions
CONCACAF Champions League
2016–17 – Group stage

References

External links
Police United

Football clubs in Belize
2012 establishments in Belize
Association football clubs established in 2012
Police association football clubs